Panzerchrist is a Danish blackened death metal band formed in 1993 by Michael Enevoldsen (after he left Illdisposed) and celebrated Danish artist Lasse Hoile.

History 
Panzerchrist recorded a few demos and was signed by Serious entertainment. Six Seconds Kill was released by Serious Entertainment in 1996, and in 1998 they released Outpost Fort Europa.

In 2000 Panzerchrist was joined by drummer Reno Killerich (ex-Exmortem, Vile, etc.) and Bo Summer (also of Illdisposed) to record Soul Collector, notorious for its WWII theme and German lyrics. Soul Collector was released by Mighty Music in 2000.

In 2002 the band was joined by Frederik O'Carroll and Rasmus Henriksen and begin work on the ultra violent Room Service, which featured compositions even more brutal and fast, including a cover of the Metal Church classic "Metal Church." Room Service was recorded at Tue Madsen's "Antfarm Studios" (The Haunted, Illdisposed, Mnemic etc.) and was released by Mighty Music in 2003. The name of each song on the album 'Room Service' are the first word(s) to be sung on each song. Each song on the album 'Room Service' ends with the words "Death, forever panzer", except the song "Metal Church", being a cover.

In 2006 Panzerchrist drummer Killerich and Karina Bundgaard, now on keyboards, rejoined for the recording of Battalion Beast which was released by Neurotic Records in 2006. This album features the words "Christ, thy name is panzer" at the end of each song.

In spring 2008 Panzerchrist vocalist Bo Summer was replaced by a vocalist known only as "Johnny". In addition, Panzerchrist, which had previously been a studio-only band, made plans to appear live.

Panzerchrist featured past and present Members from Danish and Norwegian Bands like Mercenary, Chainfist, Allfader and Illdisposed.

In 2011, Panzerchrist released the full-length album "Regiment Ragnarok", on 18 April. This was followed two years later in July 2013 with the album 7th Offensive.

Discography 
 Forever Panzer demo 1995
 Six Seconds Kill (Album, Serious, 1996)
 Outpost Fort Europa (Album, Serious, 1998)
 Soul Collector (Album, Mighty Music, 2000)
 Room Service (Album, Mighty Music, 2003)
 Battalion Beast (Album, Neurotic Records, 2006)
 Bello (Compilation, Mighty Music, 2007)
 Himmelfartskommando (Compilation, Mighty Music, 2008)
 Regiment Ragnarok (Album, Listenable Records, 2011)
 7th Offensive (Album, Listenable Records, 2013)

Members

Current members
 Søren "Sindsyg" Tintin Lønholdt - vocals (2013-present)
 Nils Petersen - guitars (2012-present)
 Michael "Panzergeneral" Enevoldsen - drums (1994-2000), keyboards (1998-2006, 2011-present), bass (2003-present)
 Simon Schilling - drums (2013-present)

Former members

Vocals
Lasse Hoile - vocals (1994-1999)
Michael Kopietz - vocals, guitars (1999-2000)
Bo Summer - vocals (2000-2008, 2012-2013)
Johnny Pump - vocals (2008-2010)
Magnus Jørgensen - vocals (2010-2012)

Guitars
Jakob Mølbjerg - guitars (1994)
Finn Henriksen - guitars (1994-1996)
Jes Christensen - guitars (1994-1996)
Rasmus Normand - guitars (1997-1999)
Kim Jensen - guitars (1997-1999)
Rasmus Henriksen - guitars (2002-2011)
Frederik O'Carroll - guitars (2002-2006)
Lasse Bak - guitars, keyboards (2008-2012)
Thomas "Hotdogger" Egede - guitars (2012-2013)

Bass
Nicolej Brink - bass (1994-1996)
Karina Bundgaard - bass, keyboards (1996-2000), keyboards (2006-2011)

Keyboards
Dea Lillelund - keyboards (2005-2006)

Drums
Reno "Killerich" Hilligsø - drums (2000-2004, 2006-2008)
Bent Bisballe Nyeng - drums (2005)
Galheim - drums (2005-2006)
Morten Løwe Sørensen - drums (2008-2011)
Mads Lauridsen - drums (2011-2012)

Timeline

References

External links
 https://www.facebook.com/panzerchristofficial

Danish death metal musical groups
Danish heavy metal musical groups
Blackened death metal musical groups
Danish black metal musical groups
Musical groups established in 1993
1993 establishments in Denmark